The Women's Cathay Pacific Hong Kong Open 2015 is the women's edition of the 2015 Hong Kong Open, which is a PSA World Series event (Prize money : 95 000 $). The event took place in Hong Kong from 1 December to 6 December. Nicol David won her tenth Hong Kong Open trophy, beating Laura Massaro in the final.

Prize money and ranking points
For 2015, the prize purse was $95,000. The prize money and points breakdown is as follows:

Seeds

Draw and results

See also
Hong Kong Open (squash)
Men's Hong Kong squash Open 2015
2015–16 PSA World Series

References

Squash tournaments in Hong Kong
Women's Hong Kong Open (squash)
Women's Hong Kong Open (squash)
2015 in women's squash